Hylorina sylvatica (also known as the Emerald forest frog, or in Spanish, sapo arboreo) is a species of frog in the family Batrachylidae. It is monotypic within the genus Hylorina. It is found in Argentina and Chile. This species is endemic to the austral Nothofagus forests of Chile and Argentina with a narrow distribution along the eastern slopes of the Andes.

Description
They are emerald-green during the day while they turn dark green at night. Adults can be found in permanent and temporary pools, swamps, and marshes. Larvae are aquatic and found in pools and ponds.

Conservation status
While Hylorina sylvatica is uncommon and threatened by habitat loss (due to, e.g., logging), IUCN classifies it as of "Least Concern" in view of its wide distribution, presumed large population, and slow rate of decline.

References

Batrachylidae
Amphibians of Patagonia
Amphibians of Argentina
Amphibians of Chile
Amphibians described in 1843
Monotypic amphibian genera
Taxa named by Thomas Bell (zoologist)
Taxonomy articles created by Polbot